Santa Fe County (meaning Holy faith in Spanish) is located in the U.S. state of New Mexico. As of the 2010 census, the population was 144,170, making it New Mexico's third-most populous county, after Bernalillo County and Doña Ana County. Its county seat is Santa Fe, the state capital.

Santa Fe County includes the Santa Fe metropolitan statistical area, which is also included in the Albuquerque–Santa Fe–Las Vegas combined statistical area.

Geography
It is the fifth-smallest county in New Mexico by area. It is drained by the Rio Grande and several of its small tributaries.

Adjacent counties
 Rio Arriba County - north
 Mora County - northeast
 San Miguel County - east
 Torrance County - south
 Bernalillo County - southwest
 Sandoval County - west
 Los Alamos County - northwest

National protected areas
 El Camino Real de Tierra Adentro National Historic Trail (part)
 Pecos National Historical Park (part)
 Santa Fe National Forest (part)

Demographics

2000 census

There were 52,482 households, out of which 30.4% had children under the age of 18 living with them, 45.5% were married couples living together, 11.7% had a female householder with no husband present, and 37.5% were non-families. 29.4% of all households were made up of individuals, and 7.4% had someone living alone who was 65 years of age or older. The average household size was 2.42 and the average family size was 3.01.

In the county, the population was spread out, with 24.1% under the age of 18, 8.1% from 18 to 24, 29.7% from 25 to 44, 27.3% from 45 to 64, and 10.8% who were 65 years of age or older. The median age was 38 years. For every 100 females there were 95.8 males. For every 100 females age 18 and over, there were 93.4 males.

The median income for a household in the county was $42,207, and the median income for a family was $50,000. Males had a median income of $33,287 versus $27,780 for females. The per capita income for the county was $23,594. About 9.4% of families and 12% of the population were below the poverty line, including 15.2% of those under age 18 and 9.7% of those age 65 or over.

2010 census
As of the 2010 census, there were 144,170 people, 61,963 households, and 36,183 families residing in the county. The racial makeup of the county was 76.2% white, 3.1% American Indian, 1.2% Asian, 0.9% black or African American, 0.1% Pacific islander, 15.1% from other races, and 3.6% from two or more races. Those of Hispanic or Latino origin made up 50.6% of the population.

The largest ancestry groups were:

 22.4% Mexican
 11.2% German
 11.1% Spanish
 10.0% English
 8.4% Irish
 3.6% French
 3.2% Italian
 2.5% Scottish
 2.3% American
 2.1% Scotch-Irish
 1.8% Polish
 1.3% Swedish
 1.3% Russian
 1.2% Dutch
 1.1% Norwegian

Of the 61,963 households, 26.9% had children under the age of 18 living with them, 42.1% were married couples living together, 11.0% had a female householder with no husband present, 41.6% were non-families, and 33.7% of all households were made up of individuals. The average household size was 2.28 and the average family size was 2.94. The median age was 43.0 years.

The median income for a household in the county was $52,696 and the median income for a family was $64,041. Males had a median income of $41,703 versus $39,215 for females. The per capita income for the county was $32,188. About 10.0% of families and 14.4% of the population were below the poverty line, including 21.4% of those under age 18 and 7.3% of those age 65 or over.

Government

The county is governed by a five-member county commission, whose members are elected from single-member districts (see map). Elections are partisan and all five seats are currently held by Democrats. County commissioners serve four-year terms, with term limits preventing them from serving more than two full terms.

Current commissioners are:

The New Mexico Corrections Department and the Penitentiary of New Mexico are located in an unincorporated area in the county.

Santa Fe County is a Democratic Party stronghold; the last Republican to carry the county in a presidential election was Richard Nixon in 1972, although Ronald Reagan nearly carried it in both his elections in 1980 and 1984. Since 1988, Democrats Michael Dukakis, Bill Clinton, Al Gore, John Kerry, Barack Obama, Hillary Clinton and Joe Biden all carried Santa Fe County by significant margins.

Education

There are currently four school districts in Santa Fe County:
 Española Public Schools
 Moriarty Municipal Schools
 Pojoaque Valley Public Schools
 Santa Fe Public Schools

State-operated school:
 New Mexico School for the Deaf

Bureau of Indian Education (BIE)-affiliated schools:
 Santa Fe Indian School (tribal)
 San Ildefonso Day School (BIE-operated)

Communities

Cities
 Española
 Santa Fe (county seat)

Town
 Edgewood

Census-designated places

 Agua Fria 
 Arroyo Hondo
 Barton (part)
 Cañada de los Alamos 
 Cañoncito
 Cedar Grove 
 Chimayo (part)
 Chupadero 
 Conejo
 Cuartelez 
 Cundiyo 
 Cuyamungue
 Cuyamungue Grant
 El Rancho 
 El Valle de Arroyo Seco 
 Eldorado at Santa Fe 
 Encantado
 Galisteo 
 Glorieta
 Golden
 Hyde Park
 Jacona
 Jaconita 
 La Bajada
 La Cienega 
 La Cueva
 La Puebla 
 La Tierra
 Lamy 
 Las Campanas
 Los Cerrillos 
 Madrid 
 Nambe
 Peak Place
 Pojoaque
 Rio Chiquito (part)
 Rio en Medio 
 San Ildefonso Pueblo
 San Pedro
 Santa Cruz 
 Santa Fe Foothills
 Seton Village 
 Sombrillo 
 Stanley 
 Sunlit Hills
 Tano Road
 Tesuque
 Tesuque Pueblo
 Thunder Mountain
 Tres Arroyos
 Valencia
 Valle Vista

Other unincorporated communities
 Totavi
 Waldo

Ghost town
 Bonanza City

See also

 National Register of Historic Places listings in Santa Fe County, New Mexico

References

External links

 Santa Fe County Website
 Santa Fe County Tourism Website
 

 
1852 establishments in New Mexico Territory
Populated places established in 1852
Hispanic and Latino American culture in New Mexico